McClatchy is a surname. Notable persons with that name include:

 Carlos K. McClatchy (1927–1989), American journalist and publisher; grandson of Charles Kenny McClatchy
 Charles Kenny McClatchy (1858–1936), American journalist and publisher
 Eleanor McClatchy (1895–1980), American publisher, Charles Kenny McClatchy's youngest daughter
 J. D. McClatchy (1945–2018), American poet and literary critic
 James McClatchy (1824–1883), American journalist and publisher
 James B. McClatchy (1920–2006), American journalist and publisher
 Kevin McClatchy (born 1963), American entrepreneur and baseball executive
 Lulu McClatchy, Australian actress
 Valentine S. McClatchy (1857–1938), American journalist and publisher

See also 
McClatchey, a surname